Clara Muhammad (born Clara Evans; also known as Clara Poole; November 2, 1899 – August 12, 1972) was born in Macon, Georgia, the daughter of Mary Lou (Thomas) and Quartus Evans. She was the wife of Nation of Islam leader Elijah Muhammad. They married in Georgia in 1917, before he changed his name from Elijah Poole. Between 1917 and 1939, Elijah and Clara Muhammad had eight children: six boys and two girls, including Warith Deen Muhammad.

Known as the First Lady of the Nation of Islam, Muhammad is credited with introducing her husband to the teachings of Nation of Islam founder W.D. Fard. She guided the organization during her husband's absence from 1935 to 1946 as he fled death threats from rival temple leaders and was then incarcerated for sedition during World War II.

In the NOI's earliest days she helped establish and run the University of Islam and Muslim Girls Training schools, which provided education for NOI members' children, considered one of the nation's early versions of religious homeschooling. Children's attendance at the schools was considered truancy and resulted in prosecutions and violent confrontations between Temple members and police in Detroit, Michigan and Chicago, Illinois.

Death and legacy
Clara Muhammad died on August 12, 1972, after a long bout with stomach cancer. Her son, Warith Deen Mohammed, who assumed leadership of the Nation of Islam in 1975, renamed the University of Islam schools the Sister Clara Muhammad Schools in her honor. There are now roughly 75 Clara Muhammad Schools across the country, including the Sister Clara Muhammad School in Boston and in Atlanta, GA.

References

1899 births
1972 deaths
Deaths from stomach cancer
Elijah Muhammad family
African-American people